Melica californica is a species of grass known by the common name California melic.

Distribution
This grass is native to Oregon and California, where it grows in many types of habitat, from mountain forests to open grassland at sea level.

Description
The inflorescence is a narrow series of purple-banded green spikelets.

Cultivation
Melica californica is cultivated in the specialty horticulture trade and available as an ornamental grass for: natural landscape, native plant, drought tolerant water conserving, and habitat gardens

See also
California native plants

References

External links
Calflora Database: Melica californica  (California melic,  California melicgrass)
Jepson Manual Treatment: Melica californica
Grass Manual Treatment: Melica californica
Melica californica Photo gallery

california
Native grasses of California
Bunchgrasses of North America
Flora of Oregon
Flora of the Sierra Nevada (United States)
Natural history of the California chaparral and woodlands
Natural history of the California Coast Ranges
Natural history of the Peninsular Ranges
Natural history of the San Francisco Bay Area
Natural history of the Santa Monica Mountains
Natural history of the Transverse Ranges
Garden plants of North America
Drought-tolerant plants
Plants described in 1885
Flora without expected TNC conservation status